Artur da Silva Bernardes (8 August 1875 – 23 March 1955) was a Brazilian politician who served as 12th president of Brazil during the First Brazilian Republic. Born in Viçosa, Minas Gerais, he was elected Governor of Minas Gerais in 1918. In 1922, he was elected President of Brazil and served until 1926. Facing a military rebellion, Bernardes ruled under a state of siege during most of the course of his term.

Honours

Foreign Honours 

  Grand Officer of the Order of Christ, Portugal (May 17, 1958)

References

 "Arthur da Silva Bernardes" at the Brazilian Presidential Library

External links
 

1875 births
1955 deaths
Presidents of Brazil
Governors of Minas Gerais
Brazilian people of Portuguese descent
Coffee with milk politics politicians
Republican Party (Brazil) politicians

Republican Party of Minas Gerais politicians